The Spotswood Football Club is an Australian rules football club which has competed in the WRFL since 1935.
They are based in the Melbourne suburb of Spotswood.

History
The Spotswood Football Club became a member of the FDFL from 1935. They were formed in 1927 and played in the Sub Districts League from 1927 to 1934 They won the 1933 premiership.
In 1935 they transferred to the Footscray District Football League.

VFL/AFL players
Charlie Sutton – Footscray
Norm Goss – Hawthorn
Fred Goldsmith – South Melbourne
Callum Urch – North Melbourne
Callan Ward – Western Bulldogs/GWS
Bachar Houli – Essendon/Richmond
John Dean – South Melbourne
Spencer White – St Kilda
 John Heriot -   South Melbourne
 Zac Del Grosso - All Italian Team of Century

Ron Viney - South Melbourne
 Ross - Longhurst Crescent

Premierships
 Western Region Football League
 Div 1 (15): 1938, 1958, 1968, 1971, 1972, 1977, 1984, 1987, 1990, 1993, 1995, 2007, 2008, 2009, 2011
 Div 2 (2): 1944, 1948

References

External links
Official website

Book
History of the WRFL/FDFL – Kevin Hillier - -  
History of football in Melbourne's north west - John Stoward -  

Australian rules football clubs in Melbourne
Australian rules football clubs established in 1927
1927 establishments in Australia
Western Region Football League clubs
Sport in the City of Hobsons Bay